The Road of the Seven Lakes is the popular name given to the scenic portion of national route 40 between the towns of San Martín de los Andes and Villa La Angostura in the Neuquén Province, in Patagonia  Argentina.

The 107 km road that crosses the Lanín and Nahuel Huapi national parks provides access to several lakes in the forest area of the Patagonic Andes, as well as to other sights.

The seven most important lakes on the way of the road after which the route is named are:
 Machónico
 Escondido
 Correntoso
 Espejo
 Lácar
 Falkner
 Villarino

Other lakes accessible through secondary paths include the Meliquina, Hermoso, Traful and Espejo chico lakes.

References

External links
 Road of the Seven Lakes  Argentinaturismo.org
 Sanmartindelosandes.gov.ar The seven lakes region 
 Villalaangostura.gov.ar Seven Lakes Circuit 
 lugaresturisticosdeargentina.com 

Tourism in Argentina